The House of Callimachi, Calimachi, or Kallimachi (originally Calmașul or Călmașu), was a Phanariote family of mixed Moldavian (Romanian) and Greek origins, whose members occupied many important positions in Moldavia, Romania and the Ottoman Empire.

History 
Originating in the boyardom of Orhei County, it gave Moldavia four reigning princes. The family remains present today in modern Romania.

Notable members

Agnatic
Vasile Călmașul, Moldavian landowner
Teodor Calmășul, Moldavian boyar
Ioan Teodor Callimachi, Prince of Moldavia (1758–1761)
Gavriil Callimachi, Orthodox monk, Metropolitan of Moldavia (?–1786)
Grigore Callimachi, Prince of Moldavia (1761–1764; 1767–1769)
Alexandru Callimachi, Prince of Moldavia (1795–1799)
Scarlat Callimachi, Prince of Moldavia (1806; de jure 1807–1810; 1812–1819); Prince of Wallachia (de jure 1821)
Alexandros Kallimachis, Ottoman diplomat, Governor of Samos (1850–1854)
Scarlat Callimachi, Romanian communist activist (1896–1975)

Matrilineal
Alexandru Papadopol-Calimah, Romanian cabinet minister and scholar
Rukmini Callimachi, American journalist

By marriage
Dida Solomon-Callimachi, Romanian actress and writer

 
Phanariotes